Francesco Arcudio, C.R. (1589 – 7 October 1641) was a Roman Catholic prelate who served as Bishop of Nusco (1639–1641).

Biography
Francesco Arcudio was born in Soliso, Italy and ordained a priest in the Congregation of Clerics Regular of the Divine Providence.
On 19 December 1639, he was appointed by Pope Urban VIII as Bishop of Nusco. 
On 25 December 1639, he was consecrated bishop by Alessandro Cesarini (iuniore), Cardinal-Deacon of Sant'Eustachio, with Marcantonio Bragadin (cardinal), Bishop of Vicenza, and Giovanni Battista Scanaroli, Titular Bishop of Sidon, serving as co-consecrators. 
He served as Bishop of Nusco until his death on 7 October 1641.

See also 
Catholic Church in Italy

References

External links and additional sources
 (for Chronology of Bishops) 
 (for Chronology of Bishops) 

17th-century Italian Roman Catholic bishops
1641 deaths
Bishops appointed by Pope Urban VIII
Theatine bishops
1589 births